The Scottish Wildlife Trust is a registered charity dedicated to conserving the wildlife and natural environment of Scotland.

Description
The Scottish Wildlife Trust has well over 35,000 members. The Scottish Wildlife Trust acquired its first wildlife reserve in 1966 and now has more than 120 reserves throughout Scotland with visitor centres at Loch of the Lowes (Perth and Kinross), Montrose Basin (Angus), and the Falls of Clyde (South Lanarkshire). As well as providing homes for wildlife these sites are valuable places for people to interact with and enjoy wildlife. The trust also seek to influence and challenge legislation for the benefit of wildlife.

The Scottish Wildlife Trust was involved in a trial reintroduction of the Eurasian beaver to Scotland. Begun in 2009, the trial ran at Knapdale until 2014. The beaver was given native species status in 2016.

Another of the Scottish Wildlife Trust's major projects is the protection of the red squirrel in Scotland. With project partners, the Saving Scotland's Red Squirrels project aims to stop the advance of the grey squirrel into the North and North East of Scotland, as well as protecting pockets of red squirrel habitat in South Scotland and Loch Lomond and the Trossachs

The trust is one of 46  Wildlife Trusts operating in the United Kingdom and the Crown Dependencies.

Selected reserves
Bemersyde Moss
Handa Island
Falls of Clyde
Montrose Basin
Loch Fleet
Loch of the Lowes
Pease Dean, Scottish Borders

See also
Royal Zoological Society of Scotland

References

External links

Charities based in Scotland
Nature conservation in Scotland
Political advocacy groups in Scotland
Scottish coast and countryside
Wildlife Trusts of the United Kingdom
1964 establishments in Scotland
Organizations established in 1964